Adam Tauman Kalai is an American computer scientist who specializes in Machine Learning and works as a Senior Principal Researcher at Microsoft Research New England.

Education and career
Kalai graduated from Harvard University in 1996 and received a PhD from Carnegie Mellon University in 2001, where he worked under doctoral advisor Avrim Blum. He did his postdoctoral study at the Massachusetts Institute of Technology before becoming a faculty member at the Toyota Technological Institute at Chicago and then the Georgia Institute of Technology. He joined Microsoft Research in 2008.

Contributions
Kalai is known for his algorithm for generating random factored numbers (see Bach's algorithm), for efficiently learning learning mixtures of Gaussians, for the Blum-Kalai-Wasserman algorithm for learning parity with noise, and for the intractability of the folk theorem in game theory.

More recently, Kalai is known for identifying and reducing gender bias in word embeddings, which are a representation of words commonly used in AI systems.

References

External links
 

Year of birth missing (living people)
Living people
American computer scientists
Georgia Tech faculty
Carnegie Mellon University alumni
Harvard University alumni